Arnald de Arceto, O.E.S.A. was a Roman Catholic prelate who served as Auxiliary Bishop of Cologne (1517–?) and Titular Bishop of Ceraunia (1517–?).

Biography
Arnald de Arceto was ordained a priest in the Order of Saint Augustine. On 20 Apr 1517, he was appointed during the papacy of Pope Leo X as Auxiliary Bishop of Cologne and Titular Bishop of Ceraunia. It is uncertain how long he served; the next Titular Bishop of Ceraunia and auxiliary bishop of record in Cologne was Nicolas Melchiori who was appointed in April 1518.

References

External links and additional sources
 (for Chronology of Bishops) 
 (for Chronology of Bishops)  

16th-century German Roman Catholic bishops
Bishops appointed by Pope Leo X
Augustinian bishops